Deutschlandradio (DLR; Radio Germany) is a national German public radio broadcaster.

History
Deutschlandfunk was originally a West German news radio targeting listeners within West Germany as well as in neighbouring countries, Deutschlandfunk Kultur is the result of a merger of West Berlin's RIAS station and East Berlin's DS Kultur after German reunification. Both networks that used to broadcast mainly on the AM bands have since spread throughout Germany, having been allocated many additional FM transmitters. However, because of lack of analogue frequencies, during 2003 Deutschlandradio changed its distribution strategy to digital terrestrial transmission.

Stations
It operates four national networks:

Deutschlandfunk: mainly news and information
Deutschlandfunk Kultur: culture in a broader sense
Deutschlandfunk Nova: aimed at young adults, mainly spoken-word
Dokumente und Debatten: opt-out channel, often for special events

Dokumente und Debatten is a digital-only special-event channel. It broadcasts coverage of the federal parliament, sports events, talk shows and shipping forecasts.  Many of the talk shows are rebroadcasts of the audio portions of TV shows made by ARD, ZDF or Phoenix.   It uses digital frequencies of both Deutschlandfunk and Deutschlandfunk Kultur.

Deutschlandfunk Nova is knowledge orientated station, started in 2010, targeting a younger audience, and broadcast only digitally – via satellite, cable, DAB, and online.

Deutschlandradio is based in Cologne, with some departments—including Deutschlandfunk Kultur—based in Berlin.

Branding
On May 1 2017, DRadio Wissen was renamed Deutschlandfunk Nova, Deutschlandradio Kultur was renamed Deutschlandfunk Kultur.

Distribution and transmitters
The three programs and the additional special event channel are all distributed terrestrially via Digital Audio Broadcasting (DAB+) on a nation-wide single frequency network (SFN) in VHF channel 5C. The coverage at the end of 2019 is for portable indoor reception 85% of the population and for mobile reception 96% of the area of Germany or 99% of the highways respectively. 

For an intermediate time the two programs Deutschlandfunk and Deutschlandfunk Kultur are still transmitted in analog way via FM with an average coverage of 64% of the area. The switch over from analogue to digital started in 2015 with the switch-off of medium wave and long wave. In 2018/2019 first small-power FM transmitters were switched-off two. The aim is to further improve the digital terrestrial coverage of DAB+ and to reduce the analogue transmission step by step. For stationary reception the programs are also distributed via satellite on the transponder of ZDF. 

Of course the programs are streamed via the internet and available on relevant platforms.
Beside the linear programs extensive non-linear content is available via audio-on-demand (podcast, mediathek and various platforms). Deutschlandradio is also very active in social media networks in order to make the content available to all public.

Orchestras and choirs
Deutschlandradio has a 40% share in Rundfunk Orchester und Chöre GmbH, a non-profit organisation which operates:

Berlin Radio Symphony Orchestra (East Berlin)
Deutsches Symphonie-Orchester Berlin
Berlin Radio Choir
RIAS Kammerchor

The other shareholders are the Federal Republic of Germany (35%), the State of Berlin (20%) and RBB (5%)

References

Further reading

External links

 Deutschlandradio website
 Live Radio

Companies based in Cologne
Deutschlandradio
Publicly funded broadcasters
Radio stations established in 1994
Radio stations in Germany
Mass media in Berlin
State media
Government-owned companies of Germany
1994 establishments in Germany